Cecilia Evelyn Manson  (24 August 1908 – 28 October 1987), known as Celia Manson, was a New Zealand writer, journalist and broadcaster. Many of her works were co-written with her husband Cecil Manson, and together they also laid the foundations for the Katherine Mansfield Menton Fellowship.

Life and career
Manson was born in Carterton on 24 August 1908. She attended Wairarapa College and subsequently Victoria University College. After university she travelled to the United Kingdom, where she worked as a freelance journalist for the BBC, including narrating a television series about three generations of a New Zealand family.

In 1939 she married Cecil Manson, an English soldier, in France. Their son Hugo was born in London in 1941. They went on to co-write several books together about New Zealand history, including children's books, and beginning with Tides of Hokianga in 1956. For some years they published weekly historical essays in The Dominion; these were published in a collection called Curtain-raiser to a Colony in 1962. They moved back to New Zealand after the end of the war, with Manson recording a programme for Wellington radio about her impressions on her return. In 1949 her book Willow's Point, an adventure story for children set in New Zealand, was published by the Museum Press in London, under the name C. Drummond Manson; her publisher anticipated that boys would not want to read a book written by a woman.

Together with her husband and Sheilah Winn she initiated the Katherine Mansfield Menton Fellowship. In 1967 Cecil and Celia visited the Villa Isola Bella where Mansfield wrote some of her best-known short stories, and discovered that a room on the lower level where she worked was derelict and not in use. Together with Winn, they decided to set up a fellowship for New Zealand authors, and formed a committee in Wellington to raise funds. Their vision was "to give a selected New Zealand writer a period of leisure to write or study ... [in] a different and more ancient culture, and thereby to see [their] own remote country in a better perspective".

In 1960 she joined the New Zealand Women Writers' Society, and in 1969 was appointed an honorary vice-president. She served as president of the society from 1970 to 1972. She was appointed a Member of the Order of the British Empire, for services to literature, in the 1977 New Year Honours. In 1978, a review of the Mansons' book The Affair of the Wellington Brig: A True and Terrible Tale by The Press described it as a "story superbly told with the skill expected of Cecil and Celia Manson".

Manson died on 28 October 1987, four months after the death of her husband.

Selected works
Manson and her husband Cecil jointly co-authored:
Tides of Hokianga (Wingfield Press, 1956)
 Doctor Agnes Bennett (Whitcombe & Tombs, 1960, also published in London by Michael Joseph)
 Curtain-raiser to a Colony (Whitcombe & Tombs, 1962)
 The Lonely One (Whitcombe & Tombs, 1963, also published in New York by Roy Publishers and in London by Epworth Press) (children's book)
 Pioneer Parade (A.H. & A.W. Reed, 1966)
 The Adventures of Johnny van Bart (Whitcombe & Tombs, 1965, also published in New York by Roy Publishers and in London by Epworth Press) (children's book)
 I Take Up My Pen: An Early Colonial Scrapbook (Pigeon Press, 1972)
The Affair of the Wellington Brig: A True and Terrible Story (Millwood Press, 1978)

Manson separately authored:
 Willow's Point (Museum Press, 1949)
Story of a New Zealand Family (Cape Catley, 1974)
The Widow of Thorndon Quay (Pigeon Press, 1981)

References

Bibliography
 

1908 births
1987 deaths
People from Carterton, New Zealand
People educated at Wairarapa College
Victoria University of Wellington alumni
New Zealand women essayists
New Zealand women historians
New Zealand women journalists
New Zealand women children's writers
20th-century New Zealand women writers
20th-century New Zealand historians
20th-century New Zealand journalists
New Zealand children's writers
New Zealand essayists
New Zealand Members of the Order of the British Empire